Catocala szechuena is a moth of the family Erebidae first described by George Hampson in 1913. It is found in western China.

References

Moths described in 1913
szechuena
Moths of Asia